Kaitlan Collins (born April 7, 1992) is an American journalist who served as chief White House correspondent for CNN until 2022. She currently hosts CNN This Morning alongside Don Lemon and Poppy Harlow. Previously, she was the White House correspondent for the website The Daily Caller.

Early life
Kaitlan Collins was born in Alabama. Her father, Jeff Collins, is a mortgage banker. Collins has described her upbringing as "apolitical," and has stated that she does not recall her parents voting or expressing strong opinions about political candidates.

Collins graduated from Prattville High School and went on to attend the University of Alabama. She initially chose to major in chemistry, like her sister, before majoring in journalism. She earned a Bachelor of Arts in political science and journalism in May of 2014. Collins was a member of the Alpha Phi sorority.

In 2018, the group Log Cabin Republicans unearthed some tweets from her time at Alabama in 2011. Collins used the slur fag and expressed that she did not know "if I wanna room with a lesbian". She apologized for the tweets, saying: "When I was in college, I used ignorant language in a few tweets to my friends. It was immature but it doesn’t represent the way I feel at all."

Career
After graduating from college, Collins moved to Washington, D.C. In June 2014, she was hired by The Daily Caller as an entertainment reporter. After covering the 2016 presidential election, the Daily Caller named her its White House correspondent in January 2017, and she began covering the Trump administration.

While she was still with The Daily Caller, Collins was invited to make several appearances on CNN. At a White House correspondent event in spring 2017, she met network president Jeff Zucker and thanked him for having her on despite the ideological nature of her current employer. Collins was subsequently interviewed and hired to join the White House team at CNN in July 2017. She traveled with President Trump to at least half a dozen countries.

Collins was involved in a notable incident with the Trump administration on July 25, 2018, when she attended a photo op in the Oval Office as the day's pool reporter. As the event concluded, Collins asked Trump a series of questions about Vladimir Putin and Trump's former attorney Michael Cohen. Trump ignored her questions. Collins was subsequently barred from a Trump administration press conference in the White House Rose Garden that afternoon and was told by senior White House officials that such questions were "inappropriate for that venue." Trump's press secretary Sarah Sanders asserted that Collins had "shouted questions and refused to leave," while Trump's advisor Kellyanne Conway said that the action was about "being polite." Trump's deputy chief of staff for communications, Bill Shine, objected to the characterization of the White House's action as a "ban" but "declined to tell reporters what word he would use to characterize the White House’s decision to block her from attending the event." CNN stated that Collins' ban was "retaliatory" and "not indicative of an open and free press." The White House Correspondents Association called the ban "wholly inappropriate, wrong-headed, and weak." Jay Wallace, president of Fox News, issued a statement in support of Collins, saying that his organization "[stood] in strong solidarity with CNN for the right to full access for our journalists as part of a free and unfettered press."

Collins served as the CNN White House correspondent for a large part of the written and televised live coverage of the 2020 United States presidential election, and was subsequently promoted to chief White House correspondent for the incoming Biden administration on January 11, 2021. At 28 years old, she was the youngest chief White House correspondent in CNN's history, and one of the youngest chief correspondents for a major media network.

On September 15, 2022, it was announced that Collins would move to co-anchoring a new revamped CNN morning show with Don Lemon and Poppy Harlow, ending her tenure as chief White House correspondent. On October 12, 2022, it was announced that the morning show would be named CNN This Morning.

See also
 New Yorkers in journalism

References

External links

1992 births
American people of Irish descent
American television reporters and correspondents
CNN people
University of Alabama alumni
Journalists from Alabama
Living people
People from Prattville, Alabama
American women television journalists
21st-century American journalists
21st-century American women writers